Christos Papageorgiou ( Athens, Greece October 13, 1944) served as the Secretary General of the International Link of Orthodox Christian Scouts, and now serves as honorary President.

In 2016, Papageorgiou was awarded the 353rd Bronze Wolf, the only distinction of the World Organization of the Scout Movement, awarded by the World Scout Committee for exceptional services to world Scouting.

References 

Recipients of the Bronze Wolf Award
1944 births
Scouting and Guiding in Greece
Living people